King Conqueror was an announced Spanish historical action film starring Tim Roth, Thomas Kretschmann, Kata Dobó and Juan Diego Botto. The producer was Pepón Sigler with a script by José Antonio Escrivá and Félix Miguel.

The story follows the lives of King Peter II of Aragon and King James I the Conqueror.

Cast
Tim Roth as King Pedro II of Aragon
Thomas Kretschmann as Archbishop of Tarragona
Kata Dobó as Violent of Hungary
Juan Diego Botto as Alphonse

Production notes
Sigler and Escrivá worked together on the Spanish TV series El botones Sacarino.

Filming began in late 2008. The film was expected to be released in 2009.  At this time, the status of the project is unknown, but considered abandoned.

In 2010, producer Sigler was artistic director on Tarancón, el quinto mandamiento.

References

External links

Unreleased films
Films set in the 13th century
English-language Spanish films
Arabic-language films
Films set in Spain
Spanish historical films
Reconquista in fiction